Acanthospermum australe (Paraguayan starburr,  ihi kukae hipa, Paraguay bur, Paraquay starbur, pipili,  sheepbur, or spiny-bur) is a South American species of herbaceous plants first described as a species in 1758.

Distribution
The species is native to:
 South America, within Brazil, French Guiana, Guyana, Suriname, Venezuela, Argentina, Paraguay, Uruguay, Bolivia, and Colombia
 Caribbean, within Grenada; Martinique; St. Vincent, and Grenadines

It has been introduced in China, and is an invasive species in parts of the United States, Canada, and South Africa. It is currently a widespread pioneer in the tropics and sub-tropics.

Extracts
Extracts of Acanthospermum australe have in vitro antiviral activity against herpesvirus and poliovirus, but clinical effects have not been studied.

References

australe
Flora of northern South America
Flora of southern South America
Flora of western South America
Flora of the Caribbean
Flora of Brazil
Flora of Paraguay
Plants described in 1758
Medicinal plants of South America
Flora without expected TNC conservation status